In Islamic history, the Bakka'in were a group of Muslim men who were saddened because they could not afford to travel with the Islamic prophet Muhammad and his army on his campaign to Tabuk. Also known as the Weepers, the Bakka'in were able to join the journey when Abdur-Rahman donated 200 awqiyyah of gold to finance the journey.

References
 Islamic Glossary: https://web.archive.org/web/20031228072807/http://www.idleb.com/Quran_and_Hadith/Terms/term.BAKKAIN.html. Visited September 27, 2007

7th-century Islam
Islamic terminology